Lamachi Elimu (born 18 August 1960) is a Kenyan wrestler. He competed in two events at the 1988 Summer Olympics.

References

External links
 

1960 births
Living people
Kenyan male sport wrestlers
Olympic wrestlers of Kenya
Wrestlers at the 1988 Summer Olympics
Place of birth missing (living people)
20th-century Kenyan people